Swing It Soldier is a 1941 American comedy film directed by Harold Young and written by Dorcas Cochran and Arthur V. Jones. The film stars Ken Murray, Frances Langford, Don Wilson, Blanche Stewart, Elvia Allman, Hanley Stafford, Susan Miller, Irving Lee and Iris Adrian. The film was released on November 7, 1941, by Universal Pictures.

Plot

Cast        
Ken Murray as Jerry Traynor
Frances Langford as Patricia Loring / Evelyn Loring Waters
Don Wilson as Brad Saunders
Blanche Stewart as Brenda
Elvia Allman as Cobina
Hanley Stafford as J. Horace Maxwellton
Susan Miller as Clementine
Irving Lee as Senor Lee 
Iris Adrian as Dena Maxwellton
Lewis Howard as Bill Waters
Thurston Hall as Oscar Simms
Kitty O'Neil as Mrs. Simms
Lew Valentine as Dr. Browning
Peter Sullivan as Elevator Boy
Tom Dugan as Sergeant
Kenny Stevens as Kenny Stevens 
Louis DaPron as Solo Dancer
Skinnay Ennis as Orchestra Leader

References

External links
 

1941 films
American comedy films
1941 comedy films
Universal Pictures films
Films directed by Harold Young (director)
American black-and-white films
1940s English-language films
1940s American films